A list of films produced in the United Kingdom in 1976 (see 1976 in film):

1976

See also
1976 in British music
1976 in British radio
1976 in British television
1976 in the United Kingdom

References

External links

1976
Films
British